Reese is an anglicised spelling of the Welsh name Rhys. It is a surname name which means ardent or fiery.

Notable people with the surname "Reese" include

A
Allan Reese (born 1967), Dutch footballer
Andrea Star Reese (born 1952), American photographer
Andy Reese (1904–1966), American baseball player
Angel Reese (born 2002), American basketball player
Archie Reese (born 1956), American football player
Aubrey Reese (born 1978), American basketball player

B
Barry Reese (born 1972), American writer
Becky Duval Reese, American art curator
Benjamin Reese (1885–1943), American baseball player
Bert Reese (1851–1926), Polish-American medium
Booker Reese (born 1959), American football player
Brian Reese (born 1971), American basketball player
Bristo W. Reese, American politician
Brittney Reese (born 1986), American long jumper

C
Carl Reese (disambiguation), multiple people
Cate Reese, American basketball player
Cathy Reese, American lacrosse coach
Charles Reese (disambiguation), multiple people
Charley Reese (1937–2013), American columnist
Chip Reese (1951–2007), American poker player
Clyde L. Reese (1958–2022), American judge
C. Shane Reese, American statistician
Curtis W. Reese (1887–1961), American minister

D
Dan Reese (disambiguation), multiple people
Dave Reese (1892–1978), American football player
David Reese (disambiguation), multiple people
Debbie Reese, American native scholar
Della Reese (1931–2017), American singer
D. H. Reese, American publisher
Don Reese (1951–2003), American football player
Don Reese (golfer) (born 1953), American golfer
Dylan Reese (born 1984), American ice hockey player

E
Eddie Reese (born 1941), American swimming coach
Elaine Reese, New Zealand academic
Ellen P. Reese (1926–1997), American professor
Enoch Reese (1813–1876), American religious figure
Evelyne Reese, Canadian politician
Everette Dixie Reese (1923–1955), American photojournalist

F
Fabian Reese (born 1997), German footballer
Florence Reese (1900–1986), American activist
Floyd Reese (1946–2021), American football executive
Frederick Reese (disambiguation), multiple people

G
George Reese (disambiguation), multiple people
Gil Reese (1901–1993), American football player
Glenn G. Reese (born 1942), American politician
Gustave Reese (1899–1977), American musicologist
Guy Reese (1939–2010), American football player

H
Hans Reese (1891–1973), German footballer
H. B. Reese (1879–1956), American businessman
Henry Reese (1909–1975), American football player
Hunter Reese (born 1993), American tennis player

I
Ike Reese (born 1973), American radio announcer
Izell Reese (born 1974), American football player

J
Jack Reese (1877–1971), New Zealand cricketer
James Reese (disambiguation), multiple people
Jason Reese (1967–2019), British engineer
Jeff Reese (born 1966), American ice hockey player
Jerry Reese (disambiguation), multiple people
Jesse Reese, American trade unionist
Jim Reese (disambiguation), multiple people
Jimmie Reese (1901–1994), American baseball player
Jimmy Reese, American baseball player
John Reese (disambiguation), multiple people
Josh Reese (born 1991), American football player
Joshua Elijah Reese (born 1984), American actor
J. P. Reese (born 1980), American mixed martial artist

K
Kevin Reese (born 1978), American baseball player

L
Lil Reese (born 1983), American rapper
Lizette Woodworth Reese (1856–1935), American poet and educator
Llew Reese (1919–1982), Australian politician
Lloyd Reese (1920–1981), American football player

M
Maggie Reese, American professional shooter
Malinda Kathleen Reese (born 1994), American internet personality
Mamie B. Reese (1911–1997), American professor
Marcus Reese (born 1981), American football player
Maria Reese (1889–1958), German teacher
Mason Reese, American actor
Melissa Reese (born 1990), American musician
Merrill Reese (born 1942), American radio announcer
Mike Reese (disambiguation), multiple people
Mona Lyn Reese (born 1951), American composer

P
Patty Ann Reese (born 1950), American tennis player
Paul Reese (1917–2004), American colonel
Pee Wee Reese (1918–1999), American baseball player
Piper Reese (born 2000), American actress and internet personality
Pokey Reese (born 1973), American baseball player

R
Rachel Reese (born 1964/1965), New Zealand politician
Ralph Reese (born 1949), American artist
Randy Reese (born 1946), American swimming coach
Red Reese (1899–1974), American athletic coach
Renford Reese (born 1967), American professor
Rhett Reese, American film producer
Rich Reese (born 1941), American baseball player
Rick Reese (1942–2022), American activist
Rico Reese (born 1983), American football player
Rita Mae Reese, American poet
Ruth Reese (1921–1990), Norwegian-American singer

S
Sam Reese (1930–1985), American actor
Seaborn Reese (1846–1907), American politician
Shayne Reese (born 1982), Australian swimmer
Skeet Reese, American fisherman
Sleeky Reese, American baseball player
Søren Reese (born 1993), Danish footballer
Steve Reese (born 1980), American soccer player
Steve Reese (American football) (born 1952), American football player
Stuart Reese (born 1954), New Zealand golfer

T
Terence Reese (1913–1996), British bridge player
Terry Reese (born 1967), American track athlete
Tevin Reese (born 1991), American football player
Theodore I. Reese (1873–1931), American bishop
Thomas J. Reese (born 1945), American priest
Tim Reese (born 1963/1964), American politician
Tom Reese (1867–1949), New Zealand cricket historian
Tom Reese (actor) (1928–2017), American actor
Tracy Reese (born 1964), American fashion designer
Tribble Reese (born 1985), American television personality

W
Ward W. Reese (1870–1927), American football coach
William Reese (disambiguation), multiple people

Fictional characters
Kyle Reese, a character in the movie franchise Terminator

See also
Reese (given name), a page for people with the given name "Reese"
Justice Reese (disambiguation), a disambiguation page for Justices surnamed "Reese"

References

Anglicised Welsh-language surnames